John Hayman Packer (12 March 1730 – 16 September 1806) was an actor for David Garrick's company at Drury Lane.  Originally a saddler, he created the character Freeman in James Townley's High Life Below Stairs (1759).  His parts were usually minor and, late in life, "as a rule" old men in tragedies and sentimental comedies.

Selected roles
 Freeman in High Life Below Stairs by James Townley (1759)
 Lucius in The Siege of Aquileia by John Home (1760)
 Don Roderigo in Elvira by David Mallet (1763)
 Sir John Lambert in The Hypocrite by Isaac Bickerstaffe (1768)
 Aunac in Zingis by Alexander Dow (1768)
 Zopiron in Zenobia by Arthur Murphy (1768)
 Greek Herald in The Grecian Daughter by Arthur Murphy (1772)
 Otanes in Sethona by Alexander Dow (1774)
 Ramirez in Braganza by Robert Jephson (1775)
 Rinaldo in The Law of Lombardy by Robert Jephson (1779)
 Ali in The Fair Circassian by Samuel Jackson Pratt (1781)
 Thestor in The Royal Suppliants by John Delap (1781)
 Marlow in The Metamorphosis by William Jackson (1783)
 Duke of Genoa in Julia by Robert Jephson (1787)
 Medley in The New Peerage by Harriet Lee (1787)
 David Duncan in The Last of the Family by Richard Cumberland (1797)
 Blaise in The Castle of Montval by Thomas Sedgwick Whalley (1799)

References
Hughes, Alan. "Packer, John Hayman." Oxford Dictionary of National Biography. 22 October 2008.  (accessed 22 October 2008; subscriiption required).
The Literary panorama

Notes

1730 births
1806 deaths
English male stage actors
18th-century English male actors